Dublany may refer to:
 Dublany, Podlaskie Voivodeship, a village in Podlaskie Voivodeship in Poland
 Dubliany, a town in Lviv Oblast in Ukraine